Charlotte Elspeth Pollard, or simply Charley, is a fictional character played by India Fisher in a series of audio plays produced by Big Finish Productions, many of which were broadcast on BBC Radio 7, based on the long-running British science fiction television series Doctor Who. A young woman from 1930s England, she is a companion of the Eighth Doctor.

Charley's final story with the Eighth Doctor was in the play The Girl Who Never Was, however this play ended with the Sixth Doctor's version of the theme tune. The play The Condemned confirmed that Charley was rescued by the Sixth Doctor and she continued to travel with this incarnation until Blue Forgotten Planet. Big Finish continued the character's later traveling in her own audio series, Charlotte Pollard, which had two volumes released in 2014 and 2017.

Character overview
Charley was born on 15 April 1912, the day the Titanic sank, and first appears in the play Storm Warning (2001). Storm takes place in 1930, making her 18 years old at the time.

She is born into a well-to-do family; her mother is Lady Louisa Pollard and two sisters, Margaret and Cecelia, are mentioned. Charley and her siblings grow up in a manor house in Hampshire, looked after by servants. However, Charley rebels against this existence and, styling herself an Edwardian adventuress, runs away from home seeking excitement. Making an appointment to meet a young man in Singapore on New Year's Day 1931, she stows away on board the Airship R101 disguised as a male member of the crew. There, she meets the Doctor and together they discover the secret mission the airship is on. At the conclusion of the story, she is rescued from the fated crash of the R101 by the Doctor and taken on board the TARDIS as his newest companion.

There are consequences to the Doctor taking Charley on board, however. According to history, Charley was supposed to die in the R101 crash and the Doctor's rescue of her causes a temporal paradox. After a while, the Web of Time begins to break down as anachronisms seep into history and "anti-time" starts to infect the universe, with Charley as both focus and gateway. The Time Lords of Gallifrey take notice, and Lord President Romana gives orders to arrest Charley and the Doctor. Charley is willing to sacrifice herself to save the universe, but the Doctor is unable to sacrifice her, taking the forces of anti-time into himself instead. History is then altered so that the paradox of Charley's continued existence became part of established history – in other words, the paradox and the resulting consequences, including the change in the timeline, were supposed to happen.

However, having absorbed anti-time, the Doctor now is a danger to the universe, and so has to exile himself into a parallel universe where time does not exist. He intended to do so alone, but Charley stows away aboard the TARDIS and follows him into exile. Eventually, the Doctor discovers he is free of the anti-time infection and he and Charley manage to find their way back, accompanied by C'rizz, a native of that other universe.

It is the later death of C'rizz that prompts her decision to leave the TARDIS. She quickly changes her mind but, due to a series of events involving Cybermen, temporal shifts and memory loss, parts company with the Doctor.  While he believes she has voluntarily left him, Charley actually ends up marooned on an island in the year 500002, believing that the Doctor had died in their confrontation with the Cybermen. She builds a makeshift crystal telegraph and sends an SOS repeatedly into space, hoping that anyone, particularly the Doctor, would rescue her. When her message is finally answered, it turned out to be the Sixth Doctor who saves her.  Charley chose to continue travelling with this earlier incarnation, keeping the circumstances of her past and his future a secret from him. This leads the Doctor to grow suspicious of her secrecy and poorly devised lies.

Eventually she runs afoul of a secret TARDIS inhabitant named Mila, who swaps places with her. Charley is infected with a virus rendering her invisible and non-corporeal while Mila pretends to be her. Of the dozens of companions Mila has secretly encountered, Charley is the only one she could infect, because she's the only companion the TARDIS refused to protect from infections. It is implied that the TARDIS hates Charley because of her multiple temporal paradoxes. Charley is cured by the mysterious Viyrans and she spends years helping in their mission to rid the universe of certain viruses. Finally she finds the Sixth Doctor again, still traveling with Mila who is still pretending to be Charley.  But Mila dies saving the Doctor's life and Charley takes the opportunity to finally set the Web of Time straight.  She asks the Viyrans to alter the Doctor's memories so that all the adventures they shared would be remembered with Mila's name and true appearance. This way, years later, when the Eighth Doctor meets Charley, he'll believe it to be their first encounter. What happens to Charley after she leaves the Sixth Doctor is unclear, but it seems she continues to work for the Viyrans.

Charley's exuberant personality matched the Eighth Doctor's well. She embraced the wonders of the universe that travel with the Doctor showed her and helped the Doctor fight the evils he encountered with courage. She was not only loyal to the Doctor, but also developed romantic feelings for him and eventually confessed them. The Doctor was very fond of Charley, and admitted later that she was his friend and he loved her, but what that meant for a virtually immortal Time Lord was unclear, as the relationship between the two was not a physical one.

Other appearances
Charley has also appeared in the short story Repercussions... by Gary Russell in the anthology Short Trips: Repercussions, set a short time after she began travelling with the Doctor.

Members of Charley's family have also appeared in Doctor Who stories. Her mother, Lady Louisa (voiced by Anneke Wills) featured in Zagreus, The Next Life, and Memory Lane. Her sister, Cecilia, (also voiced by India Fisher) featured in Gallifrey: A Blind Eye, where she is presented as a member of the League of English Fascists, committing suicide at the end of the audio after a complex encounter with Leela and Romana force her to recognize the monster that she has become. Her other sister, Margaret, appears – along with Lady Louisa and Charley's father – in the short story collection The Centenarian.

In the third issue of the ongoing Doctor Who comic book series from IDW Publishing (2009), Charley is mentioned by the Shadow Architect and the Tenth Doctor as an instance where the Doctor has interfered with a static point in time.

In the bonus tracks to the Companion Chronicle Solitaire, it was revealed that Charley would get her own series picking up from the events of Blue Forgotten Planet. Charlotte Pollard was released in two series, in 2014 and 2017.  A third series was announced, but , it is yet to be released.

Before regenerating into the War Doctor in "The Night of the Doctor", the Eighth Doctor mentions Charley, marking the first time that any of the Big Finish audio series has been directly referenced in the television show.

She is also in the Big Finish 50th-anniversary multi-Doctor special The Light at the End, briefly meeting the Fourth Doctor and Leela before the current threat temporarily erases the Fourth and Eighth Doctors from history.

List of appearances

Audio dramas

Doctor Who: The Monthly Adventures

Eighth Doctor
Storm Warning
Sword of Orion
The Stones of Venice
Minuet in Hell
Invaders from Mars
The Chimes of Midnight
Seasons of Fear
Embrace the Darkness
The Time of the Daleks
Neverland
Zagreus
Scherzo
The Creed of the Kromon
The Natural History of Fear
The Twilight Kingdom
Faith Stealer
The Last
Caerdroia
The Next Life
Terror Firma
Scaredy Cat
Other Lives
Time Works
Something Inside
Memory Lane
Absolution
The Girl Who Never Was
The End of the Beginning

Sixth Doctor
The Condemned
The Doomwood Curse
Brotherhood of the Daleks
Return of the Krotons
The Raincloud Man
Patient Zero
Paper Cuts
Blue Forgotten Planet

Doctor Who: The Eighth Doctor Adventures
Living Legend
Charlotte Pollard - The Further Adventuress
The Mummy Speaks!
Eclipse
The Slaying of the Writhing Mass
Heart of Orion

Doctor Who: The Sixth Doctor Adventures
The Sixth Doctor: The Last Adventure
The Red House

Doctor Who: Special Releases
The Light at the End
The Legacy of Time: The Avenues of Possibility

Doctor Who: The Companion Chronicles
Solitaire

Charlotte Pollard

The Lamentation Cipher
The Shadow at the Edge of the World
The Fall of the House of Pollard
The Viyran Solution
Embankment Station
Ruffling
Seed of Chaos
The Destructive Quality of Life

Big Finish audio series

Charlotte Pollard

Series 1 (2014)

Series 2 (2017)

Short Trips audios
Letting Go

Short stories
"Apocrypha Bipedium" by Ian Potter (Short Trips: Companions)
"A Good Life" by Simon Guerrier (Short Trips: Steel Skies)
"Repercussions..." by Gary Russell (Short Trips: Repercussions)
"Best Seller" by Ian Mond & Danny Oz (Short Trips: Monsters)
"After Midnight" by Andy Russell (Short Trips: A Day in the Life)
"The Heroine, The Hero and the Meglomaniac" by Ian Mond (Short Trips: A Day in the Life)
"Before Midnight" by Andy Russell (Short Trips: A Day in the Life)
"Venus" by Stuart Manning (Short Trips: The Solar System)
"War in a Time of Peace" by Steve Lockley & Paul Lewis (Short Trips: Destination Prague)
"Salva Mea" by Joseph Lidster (Short Trips: Snapshots)
"They Fell" by Scott Handcock (Short Trips: The Ghosts of Christmas)
"Doctor Who and the Adaptation of Death" by Graeme Burk (Short Trips: Transmissions)

References

Literary characters introduced in 2001
Doctor Who audio characters
Audio plays based on Doctor Who
Doctor Who spin-off companions
Big Finish Productions